Sankt Martin am Grimming is a former municipality in the judicial district of Schladming in the Austrian state of Styria.  In 2015 it merged with the municipality of Mitterberg to form the municipality of Mitterberg-St Martin.

Geography
The municipality lies between Stainach and Gröbming in the Enns valley.  It is 700m above sea level.

References

Cities and towns in Liezen District